Seyyedabad (also Romanized as Seyyedābād and Saiyidābād; also known as Seyyedābād-e Amīrābād and Seyyedābād-e Mīrābād) is a village in Qohestan Rural District, Qohestan District, Darmian County, South Khorasan Province, Iran. At the 2006 census, its population was 25, in 12 families.

References 

Populated places in Darmian County